Toronto Fire Services (TFS) provides fire protection, technical rescue services, hazardous materials response, and first responder emergency medical assistance in Toronto, Ontario, Canada. Toronto Fire Services is currently the largest municipal fire department in Canada.

History

Fire services in Toronto began in 1874 in the former City of Toronto, and still consisted of volunteer fire companies. Prior to 1874, fire services were composed of poorly trained volunteer companies in the city. The first company was created in 1826 and hook and ladder in 1831. Most were able bodied men who were trained to operate pumps to draw water from the lake. A wooden pumper truck presented to Toronto by British America Assurance Company c.1837 is now found at Black Creek Pioneer Village.

The city's poor fire fighting services were highlighted by the Great Toronto Fire in 1849 and again in the Great Fire of Toronto in 1904. After the latter fire, which destroyed much of Bay Street from The Esplanade West to Melinda Street, the Fire Department in Toronto became a critical city service and has evolved into the full-time service that exists today. 

The Toronto Fire Services was created in 1998 from the merger of the former fire departments of the original City of Toronto, East York, Etobicoke, North York, Scarborough and York. It is the largest fire department in Canada and the 5th largest municipal fire department in North America.

As part of the City's 2013 Budget plans, the City of Toronto demanded a 10% cut by all city departments. TFS, under then Fire Chief James Sales, recommended vehicle reductions at several stations (Stations 213, 215, 324 and 413) and one station to close (Station 424) to meet the 10% reduction target. As well the cuts will lead to fewer firefighters on staff.

In 2014, four pumpers (P213, P215, P413, P424) were taken out of service and Station 424 was shut down.

In 2017, under Fire Chief Matthew Pegg, the TFS Transformation Plan was developed and introduced, which included a comprehensive Inclusion Plan. An update on the status of the numerous initiatives that are included in this plan was provided as part of the 2018 budget process.

In 2018, 10 additional staff were added to support the creation of a permanent Toronto Community Housing Fire Safety Task Force. Also in 2018, one additional crew of 21 Operations Firefighters was approved to support the opening of the new Downsview fire station.

Located within Toronto's entertainment district, Pumper 332 on 260 Adelaide St. W is commonly observed to be Canada's busiest engine company, largely due to the nature of the surrounding nightlife and business districts, with thousands of calls being responded to annually, both medical and fire related.

Preceding fire services

Fire companies

 1st Engine 1826 at Church Street and Newgate Street (Adelaide Street East), renumbered as Station 5 in 1861 and closed in 1874
 Independent Fire Company Engine House No. 2
 York Fire Company 1826 at Fireman's Hall (Church Street and Newgate Street)
 Hook and Ladder Fire Company 1831
 Fireman's Hall 1839 at Bay Street 1839; closed 1841
 Station No. 1 1841; closed 1924
 4th Engine House at St. Patrick Market on Queen Street West 1842, closed 1861
 Hose Company No. 2 at Berkeley Street 1849; closed 1859
 7th Engine Company at Elizabeth Street 1857; closed 1859
 Station No 2 at 163 Portland 1871; closed 1968
 Station No 3 at 488 Yonge Street 1871; closed 1926
 Station No 5 at Court Street 1874; closed 1886
 Station No 6 at 315 Queen Street West 1874; closed 1942

Fire Departments

 Scarborough Fire Department 1925 - replaced 5 volunteer bucket brigades, 1850s
 North York Fire Department 1923 - merged seven separate volunteer brigades
 New Toronto Fire Department 1930 - merged with Etobicoke FD 1967
 Township of Etobicoke Fire Department 1955

Organization

The Fire Chief (C1),as well as the 4 commanding deputy Chiefs,(C2, C3, C4, C5), are all based at 4330 Dufferin Street - the central headquarters for both Toronto Fire and Toronto Paramedic Services. There are four division commanders (C6, C7, C8, C9). Each division commander is based in their respective commands - north, east, south and west.

Alan F. Speed became the first Fire Chief of the amalgamated Toronto Fire Services in November 1997. He served in that post until his retirement in April 2003.

Following Speed's retirement, William (Bill) Stewart was appointed Fire Chief on May 1 st, 2003 and served until his retirement on April 30, 2012.

Jim Sales worked as a political bureaucrat in Town of Markham and as General Manager with the City of Barrie prior to his appointment as Toronto Fire Chief in 2012. Sales was Fire Chief in Markham from 2000 to 2001 and in Edmonton from 1988 to 2000.

Matthew Pegg was appointed as interim Fire Chief in May 2016, following Sales' departure. Pegg became permanent Chief in April 2017. Pegg served as Deputy Fire Chief of Administration prior to being appointed Fire Chief.

Previous Chiefs
With the exception of Sales,  Toronto Fire Services and Toronto Fire Department Chiefs have been promoted within the department's ranks. Peter Ferguson was Deputy Chief of the North York Fire Department before becoming Fire Chief of the Toronto Fire Department

 Bernard (Ben) Bonser: 1977–1988Toronto Fire Department
 Walter Shanahan: 1988–1995, Toronto Fire Department
 Peter L Ferguson: 1995-1997,Toronto Fire Department
 Alan F. Speed: 1997–2003
 William A. Stewart: 2003–2012
 Jim W. Sales: 2012-2016

Rank structure

Communications

Structure/building fires

Operations

Equipment

 Innotex - current bunker gear
 Cairns 660C Metro Composite Fire Helmet - current fire helmet (as of June 2018)
 Drager UCF 7000 Thermal Imaging Camera
 Globe Supreme 14 Fire Boot
 MSA G1 Self Contained Breathing Apparatus

Fire Apparatus

Toronto Fire Department began using motorized vehicles after 1911. The first motorized pumper was placed in the College St station on October 18, 1911. Before that, the TFD and previous fire companies used horse drawn engines and ladders. Prior to the 1970s, the TFD had open air vehicles (driver cab not enclosed and mostly aerial trucks), but since then both the TFD and TFS use fully enclosed cab vehicles. Prior to the 1950s, TFD used tiller-ladder trucks and since have reverted to smaller aerial units that can operate in narrow streets in Toronto.

The TFS inherited all the vehicles of the fire departments prior to amalgamation. The current strength of TFS consists of 179 vehicles. Since amalgamation, apparatus assignments consist of an alpha-numeric callsign. The alphabetic prefix identifies the type of apparatus. The following three numerical digits identify the station the apparatus is located in. The first digit identifies the division (Command) that the station is in (1-North, 2-East, 3-South, 4-West). The second digit identifies the District within the Command that the station is in. The last digit identifies the station within the District within the Command that the apparatus is assigned to.

A list of types of vehicles used by the TFS: (prefix letter in brackets with "xxx" as the station placeholders) is listed below:

 Frontline Apparatus (Staffed)
 Pumper (Pxxx) - Standard pumper truck. Pumpers are equipped with firefighting gear as well as basic rescue tools and other equipment
 Rescue (Rxxx) - Rescue pumper truck. Rescue units are equipped with firefighting gear as well as a variety of rescue and extrication tools and equipment. This includes the Jaws Of Life, Rescue saws and other tools and equipment.
 Aerial (Axxx) - Straight aerial ladder (stick); lengths range from 75 to 105 feet (23 to 32 metres). Configured as a quint (pump/tank)
 Ladder (Lxxx) - Straight aerial ladder (stick); lengths range from 100 to 105 feet (30 to 32 metres). Configured as truck (no pump/no tank).
 Tower (Txxx) - Aerial platform with articulating boom ladder. Two units only, with 1 found in South Command and 1 in North Command; length 114 feet (35 metres)
 Platform (PLxxx) - Aerial ladder with attached platform. One unit only, found in West Command; length 100 feet (30 metres)
 Squad (Sxxx) - Heavy rescue units. These units are equipped with extrication tools as well as various types of technical rescue equipment and tools. Five units total, with two located in South Command and one each in of North, East, and West Commands.
 Haz-Mat Unit (HZxxx) - Specialized trucks containing equipment for hazardous materials/dangerous goods incidents. Two units only, one in each of North and South Commands.
 High Rise Unit (HRxxx) - Specialized rescue trucks containing equipment for high-rise incidents. Two units only, one in each of North and South Commands.
 High capacity Foam Pumper (2021)

 Chief units and Command Vehicles
 Fire Chief / Deputy Chief (Cx) - Senior exempt rank members of the department
 Division Commander (Cx) - 1 in each Command (C6, C7, C8, C9)
 Division Chief (DVC) - 1 for Communications, Mechanical, Investigations, Prevention, Finance and Data Analytics 
 Platoon Chief (PCx0) - 1 in each Command (C10, C20, C30, C40)
 District Chief (DCxx)
 Command (CMDxx) - 3 throughout the city

 Support Apparatus (Cross-staffed)
 Hazmat Support Unit (HSxxx) - Unmanned equipment vehicle
 Decontamination Unit (DExxx)
 Water Tanker (WTxxx) - 1 only, in East Command
 Rapid Attack Vehicle - 1 only, on Toronto Islands
 All-Terrain Vehicle (ATVx) - used at special events, such as the Canadian National Exhibition
 Mini Pumper (MPxxx)
 Multi-Purpose Vehicle (MPVxxx)
 Fireboat (FBxxx) - 2 units, both stationed in Toronto Harbour
 Trench Rescue Support Truck (TRSxxx) - 1 only, in East Command
 Air/Light Unit (LAxxx) - 1 in each Command (LA111, LA231, LA333, LA421)
 Mechanical Response Unit (MRUxxx)

 Miscellaneous Apparatus
 Training Pumper (TRPx) - Used by Professional Development and Training
 Spare vehicles (X5xxx) - Backup apparatus used to temporarily replace frontline apparatus
 Fire Investigator (FIx)

Fire boats

The Toronto Fire Department and successor Toronto Fire Services has operated fire boats since 1923. Fireboat Charles A. Reed was the first fireboat operated by the service, and was a wood hull boat that entered service in 1923 and remained in use until 1964.

The service presently has two fireboats in service. Fireboat William Lyon Mackenzie entered service in 1964, replacing Charles A. Reed. Fireboat William Lyon Mackenzie serves as the department's main fireboat and icebreaker. In 2006, the Toronto Fire Services acquired Fireboat Sora, a light utility boat built in 1982 for the Canadian Coast Guard. The Sora was retired from TFS on October 31, 2015, replaced by Fireboat William Thornton. Fireboat ''William Thornton is a type 400 cutter built in 1982 for the Canadian Coast Guard, and was acquired by the Toronto Fire Service in 2015.

Miscellaneous units
While not part of the fleet, Box 12 (Box 12 Association) and Support 7 (Greater Toronto Multiple Alarm Association) are canteen trucks run by volunteers and are present at large emergencies to provide food and beverages for Toronto firefighters.

Formed in 1949, the Box 12 Association is Toronto’s oldest fire canteen unit, and serves firefighters in the west end and the downtown core. The unit is named after alarm box #12, which was pulled to trigger the response to the Great Toronto Fire of 1904. This canteen has served in a number of high profile multiple alarm fires in recent history, including the Badminton and Racquet Club of Toronto six alarm fire in 2017. The Box 12 Association celebrated 70 years of continuous volunteer service in 2018, with Mayor John Tory in attendance. Each year, an award named after this canteen is presented by the Toronto Professional Fire Fighters Association to a fire service member for voluntarism.

Formed in 1975, the GTMAA vehicle is painted with TFD scheme, but not the logo (using the GTMAA patch instead). 

In addition, there are various Hazardous Materials Support trucks and a Trench Rescue Support truck that respond to specialized calls. These trucks are unmanned, and are only used by trained personnel when a specialized call is dispatched. TFS also has a fleet of various mechanical support trucks. Smaller compact cars bearing the TFS colours and logo are driven by fire prevention officers and other commanding officers.

Toronto Fire will also acquire use of the Long Range Acoustic Device. It was one of three purchased by the Toronto Police Service for use during the G20 summit in 2010 (1 for Marine Unit, 2 for Public Safety Unit).

Toronto Fire Services operates and manages both the Heavy Urban Search and Rescue (HUSAR) team and the Chemical, Biological, Radiological, Nuclear and Explosives (CBRNE) response team on behalf of the City of Toronto and under contract with the Province of Ontario for Provincial deployment as required as CAN-TF3.

Prior to amalgamation, the Scarborough Fire Department had their fleet painted yellow. In the years following amalgamation the markings on the fire trucks were a patchwork of the various schemes used by the former boroughs. All had "Toronto" decaled or painted where the former borough's name used to be and the new Toronto Fire crest was added with the new numbering scheme. Over the past 19 years - post amalgamation - the majority of the older vehicles have either been retired or repainted to match the new scheme: fire engine red with yellow reflective trim and markings.

Fire Stations
The Toronto Fire Services (TFS) currently operates out of 83 Fire Stations throughout the city, organized into 15 Districts. A 16th District (District 12) was disbanded in 2013. Its 4 stations were absorbed into the surrounding districts. Each District is part of one of four geographical divisions of Command. There are 4 Command areas: North, East, South and West. With the exception of North Division, the other geographic divisions are divided into four Districts . Several Companies have been disbanded or reassigned over the years.

North Command
The North Command's Office (Command 1) is located at Fire Station 114. There are 21 Stations in the North Command

East Command
The East Command's Office (Command 2) is located at Fire Station 221. There are 22 Stations in the East Command.

South Command
The South Command's Office (Command 3) is located at Fire Station 332. There are 22 Stations in South Command.

West Command
The West Command's Office (Command 4) is located at Fire Station 442. Fire Station 424 at 462 Runnymede Road closed permanently in 2014. There are 19 Stations in West Command.

See also

 List of historic Toronto fire stations
 Woodbine Building Supply fire

Other members of Toronto's Emergency Services structure include:
 Toronto (CAN-TF3) Heavy Urban Search and Rescue
 Toronto Paramedic Services
 Toronto Police Service

References

External links

 
 Toronto Fire Services – Active Incidents (LiveCAD)

 
Fire departments in Ontario